Mainland is a geomorphological/geopolitical term.

Mainland may also refer to:
 Mainland (cheese), cheese brand owned by Fonterra
 The Mainland (Father Ted), episode of the Channel 4 sitcom Father Ted
 Mainland, Western Australia, town in Western Australia
 Mainland, Newfoundland and Labrador, a village in Canada
 Mainland, Orkney, the main island of Orkney, Scotland
 Mainland, Shetland, the main island of Shetland, Scotland
 Mainland, Pennsylvania, an unincorporated community in the United States
 Mainland High School, Daytona Beach, Florida
 Mainland (band)